The Wyoming High School Activities Association (WHSAA) is the organization that runs and regulates all interscholastic high school activities in the U.S. state of Wyoming. The WHSAA was founded in the 1920s to regulate athletic competition between Wyoming's high schools. The organization has since grown to assist other interscholastic activities such as drama  and music.

References

External links
Official site

Education in Wyoming
High school sports associations in the United States
Sports organizations established in the 1920s
Sports in Wyoming
1920s establishments in Wyoming